French personal pronouns (analogous to English I, you, he/she, we, and they) reflect the person and number of their referent, and in the case of the third person, its gender as well (much like the English distinction between him and her, except that French lacks an inanimate third person pronoun it or a gender neutral they and thus draws this distinction among all third person nouns, singular and plural). They also reflect the role they play in their clause: subject, direct object, indirect object, or other.

Personal pronouns display a number of grammatical particularities and complications not found in their English counterparts: some of them can only be used in certain circumstances; some of them change form depending on surrounding words; and their placement is largely unrelated to the placement of the nouns they replace.

Overview

The second person

French has a T-V distinction in the second person singular. That is, it uses two different sets of pronouns: tu and vous and their various forms.

The usage of Tu and Vous depends on the kind of relationship (formal or informal) that exists between the speaker and the person with whom they are speaking and the age differences between these subjects.  The pronoun tu is informal and singular, spoken to an individual who is equal or junior to the speaker. The pronoun vous is used in the singular (but with second-person plural verb forms) to speak to an individual who is senior to the speaker or socially "more important" than the speaker. Vous is also used in the plural for all groups of people, whether junior, equal or senior.

Subject pronouns

As noted above, the personal pronouns change form to reflect the role they play in their clause. The forms used for subjects are called the subject pronouns, subjective pronouns, or nominative pronouns. They are as follows:

When the predicate is être ("to be") plus a noun phrase, the pronoun ce (c in elision contexts) is normally used instead of the other third person subject pronouns. For example, « C'est un homme intelligent » ("He is a smart man"), « Ce sont mes parents » ("Those are my parents"). Ce is primarily used as a "neuter" pronoun to refer to events and situations: « J'ai vu Jean hier. C'était amusant. », "I saw John yesterday. It was fun."

Neologisms such as iel(le), ille, ul, ol and yul have emerged in recent years as gender-neutral alternatives to the masculine and feminine pronouns, but are not yet considered standard in French  despite their use in some speech communities.

On

The subject pronoun on (from Old French [h]om, homme "man", from Latin homo "human being") is equivalent to the English indefinite pronouns one, you, and they (as in, "One is pleased to see...", "You never know what will...", and "They speak French in..."). It takes third-person singular verb forms in the same way that il and elle do, and is used:

 In the same way as English "one", "you" and "they", where the subject is generalised or otherwise unclear or unimportant:
 « C'est en forgeant que lon devient forgeron. » "It is by blacksmithing that one becomes a blacksmith."
 « penser que lon a raison » "to think that you are right," i.e. "to think oneself right."
 As an extension of the above, it is often used to avoid the passive voice in French:
 « On me l'a donné. » "[Someone] gave it to me." In English, it would be more common to say, "It was given to me.", which would be rendered as « Ça / il / elle m'a été donné(e). » in French.
 To replace the subject pronoun nous in informal speech. In this case, on takes plural adjectives, even though it always takes a third-person singular verb. The corresponding reflexive object pronoun, se, is also third-person, but first-person possessive pronouns must be used when on meaning nous is the antecedent.  The associated disjunctive pronoun in this context is nous.
 « On est sur le point de partir. » "We are about to go."
 « Nous, on est américains, et vous, vous êtes français. » "Us, we are American, and you, you are French."
 « On se débarrasse de nos bagages ? » "Shall we get rid of our luggage?"

It is never used for the number one, or as in one of them. As in English, numbers can be used as pronouns, and this is also true of the French word un(e): 
 « Deux sont entrés et un est ressorti » "Two went in and one came back out."

On has limited pronoun forms: it has only a reflexive form, se, and a disjunctive form soi (which is also only used when the sense is reflexive). The pronoun quelqu'un ("someone") can sometimes be used to fill the roles of on:
 « Quelqu'un m'a dit... » "Someone told me..."

Direct-object pronouns

Like the English him, her, it, and them, the pronouns le, la, and les are only used with definite direct objects. For indefinite ones (e.g., "some juice"), en is used; see "The pronoun en" below.

Le, la, and les are not used when the direct object refers to the same entity as the subject; see the section on the reflexive pronouns, below.

Examples:
 (I have a book.) I am giving it to the teacher. « Je le donne au prof. »
 (Danielle is my sister.) Have you seen her? « Est-ce que tu l'as vue ? »

Indirect-object pronouns

In French, an indirect object is an object of a verb that is introduced using a preposition (especially the preposition à). For example, in the sentence « J'ai parlé à Jean » ("I spoke to Jean"), Jean is the indirect object in the French sentence.

Indirect-object pronouns (or dative pronouns) generally only replace indirect objects with the preposition à. When an indirect object pronoun is used, it replaces the entire prepositional phrase; for example, « Je lui ai donné un livre » ("I gave him a book").

Broadly speaking, lui and leur are used to refer to people, and y (see "The pronoun y" below) is used to refer to things. However, lui and leur will sometimes also be used in referring to things.

Lui, leur, and y are replaced with se (s before a vowel) when the indirect object refers to the same entity as the subject; see the section on the reflexive pronouns below.

As mentioned above, the indirect object pronouns are not always used to replace indirect objects:
 They are not used when the preposition is de rather than à; but see the section on the pronoun en, below.
 Some verbs are incompatible with indirect object pronouns, such as penser ("to think about") and all reflexive verbs. For example, one says, « Je me fie à lui » ("I put my trust in him"), not « * Je me lui fie ».

Reflexive pronouns

In French, as in English, reflexive pronouns are used in place of direct- and indirect-object pronouns that refer to the same entity or entities as the subject. A verb with a reflexive pronoun is called a reflexive verb, and has many grammatical particularities aside from the choice of pronoun; see French verbs.

There are four kinds of reflexive verbs:
 Verbs that are inherently reflexive. For example, the verb se souvenir ("to remember") has no non-reflexive counterpart; the verb souvenir has no meaning on its own.
 Verbs whose direct or indirect objects refer to the same entities as their subjects. For example, « Je m'achèterai cela » ("I shall buy myself that") is just a special case of « Je lui achèterai cela » ("I shall buy him that") that happens to be reflexive.
 Verbs indicating reciprocal actions. For example, « Ils se parlent » means "They are talking to each other." In cases of possible ambiguity, the reciprocal interpretation can be reinforced by adding « Ils se parlent l'un à l'autre ».
 Verbs indicating a passive action. For example, one might say, « La porte s'ouvre », which literally means, "The door is opening itself," but really means, "The door is opening."
All four kinds use the reflexive pronouns, and exhibit the grammatical particularities of reflexive verbs.

Disjunctive pronouns

Disjunctive pronouns are the strong forms of French pronouns, the forms used in isolation and in emphatic positions (compare the use of me in the English sentence "Me, I believe you, but I am not sure anyone else will"; for more, see Intensive pronoun).

In French, disjunctive pronouns are used in the following circumstances:
 as the objects of prepositions: « Je le fais pour toi », "I am doing it for you."
 in dislocated positions: « Toi, je t'ai déjà vu, moi. », "You, I have seen you before, I have."
 in cleft sentences: « C'est toi qui as tort », "It is you who are wrong." lit. "It is you who have error/wrong."
 in compound noun phrases: « Lui et moi sommes américains », "He and I are American" (though one might equally say, « Lui et moi, nous sommes américains / on est américains »).
 as emphatic subjects (third person only): « Lui sait le faire », "He knows how to do it" (though one might equally say, « Lui, il sait le faire »).

The reflexive disjunctive form soi can be used as the object of a preposition, if it refers to the same entity as the subject. For example, « Un voyageur sait se sentir chez soi n'importe où », "A traveller knows how to feel at home anywhere." Note that this does not make the verb reflexive.

The pronoun y
The pronoun y has two distinct uses:
 It is the indirect-object pronoun used with things introduced by the preposition à. For more on this use, see above.
 It is used to replace a spatial prepositional phrase. In this sense, it might be translated as there. For example:
 « Je vais à Paris. » → « Jy vais. » ("I am going to Paris." → "I am going there.")
 « Est-ce que tu travailles dans ce bureau ? — Non, je ny travaille plus. » ("Do you work in that office? — No, I do not work there anymore.")
 It is used idiomatically with certain verbs, without replacing anything:
 « Il doit y avoir une erreur. » ("There must be a mistake.")
 « Je commence à y voir un peu plus clair. » ("I am starting to see things more clearly.")

The pronoun en
The pronoun en has the following uses:
It is the indirect-object pronoun used with things (including infinitives) introduced by the preposition de. It is also sometimes used in the same way with people (however, it is more common to use disjunctive pronouns rather than using en in the case of people).:
« Je parle du problème. » → « Jen parle. » ("I am talking about the problem." → "I am talking about it.")
« Je parle de Jean. » → « Jen parle. » or « Je parle de lui. » ("I am talking about Jean." → "I am talking about him.")
It is used to replace a spatial prepositional phrase introduced by de ("from"). In this sense, it might be translated as from there:
« Je viens de France. » → « Jen viens. » ("I come from France." → "I come from there.")
It is the direct-object pronoun used to replace indefinite direct objects; that is, direct objects that are:
introduced by the partitive article (including the plural indefinite article)
« Jai bu du jus de pomme. » → « Jen ai bu. » ("I drank some apple juice." → "I drank some.")
introduced by de when the verb is negated
« Je n'ai pas vu de vaches. » → Je n'en ai pas vu. ("I did not see any cows."  → "I did not see any.")
introduced by a numeral (including the singular indefinite article) or a plural expression (d'autres, certains, quelques)
« J'ai mangé une pomme. » → « Jen ai mangé une. » ("I ate an apple." → "I ate one.")
« J'ai mangé quelques pommes. » → Jen ai mangé quelques-unes. ("I ate a number of apples." → "I ate a number of them.")
introduced by another expression of quantity (usually an adverb + de)
« J'ai vendu beaucoup de jus de pomme. » → « Jen ai vendu beaucoup. » ("I sold a lot of apple juice." → "I sold a lot.")
« J'ai acheté trois kilogrammes de pommes. » → « Jen ai acheté trois kilogrammes. » ("I bought three kilograms of apples." → "I bought three kilograms.")
It is used idiomatically with certain verbs, without replacing anything:
« J'en veux à Jean. » ("I am mad at Jean.")
« Je vais en finir avec lui. » ("I am going to finish things off with him.")

Clitic order
French personal pronouns, aside from their disjunctive forms, are all clitics, and the order of pronominal clitics as well as the negative clitic ne is strictly determined as follows.  Only one clitic can be used for each slot.  Where one wishes to express an idea that would involve slots that cannot coexist or multiple pronouns from the same slot, the indirect object is expressed as the object of à or pour (thus Je me donne à toi – "I give myself to you"). The use of more than two clitics beyond the subject and, where necessary, ne is uncommon; constructions such as Je lui y en ai donné may be perceived as unacceptable, and other constructions must then be used to express the same ideas.

Proclitic order Slots 3 and 5 cannot coexist.

Enclitic order Used only for positive imperatives.  Slots 2 and 3 cannot coexist.

 The clitics -moi and -toi become -m' and -t' respectively when followed by either -en or -y.  In colloquial French, however, it is possible to keep -moi and -toi intact and change -en and -y to -z-en and -z-y respectively, or to put slot 5 before slot 3, or less commonly, before slot 1 or 2.
ex. The imperative sentences corresponding to « Tu m'en donnes »:
« Donne-m'en. »  (formal)
« Donne-moi-z-en. »  (informal)
« Donnes-en-moi. »  (informal)

See also
 French pronouns

References

Personal pronouns
Pronouns by language